Jón Halldór Kristjánsson (born 11 June 1942) is an Icelandic politician and former Minister of Social Affairs.

External links 
 Biography

1942 births
Living people
Jon Halldor Kristjansson
Jon Halldor Kristjansson
Jon Halldor Kristjansson